A by-election was held for the New South Wales Legislative Assembly electorate of Tenterfield on 3 December 1861 because Robert Meston resigned. Meston sent a letter to the Speaker of the Legislative Assembly which stated "As I find it very inconvenient for my affairs at present to attend on the very inopportune sittings of the New Smith Wales Parliament, I hereby resign my seat as representative of the Tenterfield electorate".

Dates

Polling places

Result

Robert Meston resigned.

See also
Electoral results for the district of Tenterfield
List of New South Wales state by-elections

Notes

References

1861 elections in Australia
New South Wales state by-elections
1860s in New South Wales